Ancylostomiasis  is a hookworm disease caused by infection with Ancylostoma hookworms. The name is derived from Greek ancylos αγκύλος  "crooked, bent" and stoma στόμα "mouth".

Ancylostomiasis is also known as miner's anaemia, tunnel disease, brickmaker's anaemia and Egyptian chlorosis. Helminthiasis may also refer to ancylostomiasis, but this term also refers to all other parasitic worm diseases as well. In the United Kingdom, if acquired in the context of working in a mine, the condition is eligible for Industrial Injuries Disability Benefit. It is a prescribed disease (B4) under the relevant legislation.§

Ancylostomiasis is caused when hookworms, present in large numbers, produce an iron deficiency anemia by sucking blood from the host's intestinal walls.

Signs and symptoms
Depending on the organism, the signs and symptoms vary. Ancylostoma duodenale and Necator americanus can enter the blood stream while Ancylostoma braziliensis cannot. Signs and symptoms of Ancylostoma duodenale and Necator americanus are given in corresponding page. 

In Ancylostoma braziliensis as the larvae are in an abnormal host, they do not mature to adults but instead migrate through the skin until killed by the host's inflammatory response. This migration causes local intense itching and a red serpiginous lesion. Treatment with a single dose of oral ivermectin results in cure rates of 94–100%.

Causes
The infection is usually contracted by people walking barefoot over
contaminated soil. In penetrating the skin, the larvae may cause an allergic
reaction. It is due to the itchy patch at the site of entry that the early
infection gets its nickname "ground itch". Once larvae have broken through the skin,
they enter the bloodstream and are carried to the lungs (however, unlike ascarids, hookworms do not usually cause pneumonia). The larvae migrate from
the lungs up the windpipe to be swallowed and carried back down to the
intestine. If humans come into contact with larvae of the dog hookworm or the
cat hookworm, or of certain other hookworms that do not infect humans, the
larvae may penetrate the skin. Sometimes, the larvae are unable to complete their
migratory cycle in humans. Instead, the larvae migrate just below the skin
producing snake-like markings. This is referred to as a creeping eruption or
cutaneous larva migrans.

Diagnosis
They commonly infect the skin, eyes, and viscera in humans.
 Ancylostoma brasiliensis causes cutaneous larva migrans.
 Toxocara causes visceral larva migrans.

Prevention
Control of this parasite should be directed against reducing the level of
environmental contamination. Treatment of heavily infected individuals is one
way to reduce the source of contamination (one study has estimated that 60% of
the total worm burden resides in less than 10% of the population). Other
obvious methods are to improve access to sanitation, e.g. toilets, but also
convincing people to maintaining them in a clean, functional state, thereby making
them conducive to use.

Treatment
The drug of choice for the treatment of hookworm disease is mebendazole which is effective against both species, and in addition, will remove the intestinal worm Ascaris also, if present. The drug is very efficient, requiring only a single dose and is inexpensive. However, treatment requires
more than giving the anthelmintic, the patient should also receive dietary supplements to improve their general level of health, in particular iron supplementation is very important. Iron is an important constituent of a multitude of enzyme systems involved in energy metabolism, DNA synthesis and
drug detoxification.

An infection of N. americanus parasites can be treated by using benzimidazoles, albendazole, and mebendazole. A blood transfusion may be necessary in severe cases of anemia. Light infections are usually left untreated in areas where reinfection is common. Iron supplements and a diet high in protein will speed the recovery process.  In a case study involving 56–60 men with Trichuris trichiura and/or N. americanus infections, both albendazole and mebendazole were 90% effective in curing T. trichiura.  However, albendazole had a 95% cure rate for N. americanus, while mebendazole only had a 21% cure rate.  This suggests albendazole is most effective for treating both T. trichiura and N. americanus.

During the 1910s, common treatments for hookworm included thymol, 2-naphthol, chloroform, gasoline, and eucalyptus oil. By the 1940s, the treatment of choice was tetrachloroethylene, given as 3 to 4 cc in the fasting state, followed by 30 to 45 g of sodium sulfate.  Tetrachloroethylene was reported to have a cure rate of 80 percent for Necator infections, but 25 percent in Ancylostoma infections, requiring re-treatment.

Epidemiology 

Hookworm anaemia was first described by Wilhelm Griesenger in Egypt, Cairo in 1852. He found thousands of adult ancylostomes in the small bowel of a 20-year old soldier who was suffering from severe diarrhoea and anaemia (labelled at the time as Egyptian chlorosis). The subject was revisited in Europe when there was an outbreak of "miner's anaemia" in Italy. During the construction of the Gotthard Tunnel in Switzerland (1871–81), a large number of miners suffered from severe anaemia of unknown cause. Medical investigations let to the understanding that it was caused by Ancylostoma duodenale (favoured by high temperatures and humidity) and to "major advances in parasitology, by way of research into the aetiology, epidemiology and treatment of ancylostomiasis".

Hookworms still account for high proportion of debilitating disease in the tropics and 50–60,000 deaths per year can be attributed to this disease.

References

External links 

Parasitic infestations, stings, and bites of the skin
Helminthiases